is a Japanese footballer currently playing as a defender for Tegevajaro Miyazaki.

Career statistics

Club
.

Notes

References

1998 births
Living people
Association football people from Nagasaki Prefecture
Tokuyama University alumni
Japanese footballers
Association football defenders
J3 League players
V-Varen Nagasaki players
Tegevajaro Miyazaki players